The Monza Circuit is a  race track near the city of Monza, north of Milan, in Italy. Built in 1922, it was the world's third purpose-built motor racing circuit after Brooklands and Indianapolis and the oldest in mainland Europe. The circuit's biggest event is the Italian Grand Prix. With the exception of the 1980 running, the race has been hosted there since 1949.

The major features of the main Grand Prix track include the Curva Grande, the Curva di Lesmo, the Variante Ascari and the Curva Alboreto (formerly Curva Parabolica). The high speed curve, Curva Grande, is located after the Variante del Rettifilo which is located at the end of the front straight or Rettifilo Tribune, and is usually taken flat out by Formula One cars.

In addition to Formula One, the circuit previously hosted the 1000 km Monza, an endurance sports car race held as part of the World Sportscar Championship and the Le Mans Series. Monza also featured the unique Race of Two Worlds events, which attempted to run Formula One and USAC National Championship cars against each other. The racetrack also previously held rounds of the Grand Prix motorcycle racing (Italian motorcycle Grand Prix), WTCC, TCR International Series, Superbike World Championship, Formula Renault 3.5 Series and Auto GP. Monza currently hosts rounds of the Blancpain GT Series Endurance Cup, International GT Open and Euroformula Open Championship, as well as various local championships such as the TCR Italian Series, Italian GT Championship, Porsche Carrera Cup Italia and Italian F4 Championship, as well as the Monza Rally Show. In 2020, Monza hosted the 2020 World Rally Championship final round, ACI Rally Monza, with the circuit hosting 10 of the 16 rally stages.

Monza also hosts cycling and running events, most notably the Monza 12h Cycling Marathon and Monza 21 Half Marathon. The venue was also selected by Nike scientists for the Breaking2 event, where three runners attempted to break the 2 hour barrier for the marathon. Eliud Kipchoge ran 2:00:25.

A very fast circuit, Monza has been the site of many fatal accidents, especially in the early years of the Formula One world championship, and has claimed the lives of 52 drivers and 35 spectators. Track modifications have continuously occurred, to improve spectator safety and reduce curve speeds, but it is still criticised by the current drivers for its lack of run-off areas, most notoriously at the chicane that cuts the Variante della Roggia.

History

Early history 

The first track was built from May to July 1922 by 3,500 workers, financed by the Milan Automobile Club – which created the Società Incremento Automobilismo e Sport (SIAS) (English: Motoring and Sport Encouragement Company) to run the track. The track was officially opened on 3 September 1922, with the maiden race the second Italian Grand Prix held on 10 September 1922.

In 1928, the most serious Italian racing accident to date ended in the death of driver Emilio Materassi and 27 spectators at that year's Italian Grand Prix. The accident led to further Grand Prix races' confinement to the high-speed loop until 1932. For these reasons the Italian Grand Prix wasn't held again until 1931; in the meantime the 1930 Monza Grand Prix was held on the high speed ring only, while in 1930 Vincenzo Florio introduced the Florio Circuit. The 1933 Italian Grand Prix was held on the original complete layout but it was marred by the deaths of three drivers (Giuseppe Campari, Baconin Borzacchini and Stanisław Czaykowski) in the supporting Monza Grand Prix held on the same day - which became known as the "Black Day of Monza" - over the shorter oval circuit and the Grand Prix layout was changed: in 1934 a short circuit with two lanes of the straight line joined by a hairpin, Curva Sud of the banking (with a double chicane) driven in the opposite direction than usual, the "Florio link" and the Curva Sud (with a small chicane). This configuration was considered too slow and in 1935 Florio Circuit was used again, this time with four temporary chicanes and another one permanent (along the Curva Sud of the banking). In 1938 only the last one was used.

There was major rebuilding in 1938–39, constructing new stands and entrances, resurfacing the track, removing the high speed ring and adding two new bends on the southern part of the circuit. The outbreak of World War II meant racing at the track was suspended until 1948 and parts of the circuit degraded due to the lack of maintenance and military use. Monza was renovated over a period of two months at the beginning of 1948 and a Grand Prix was held on 17 October 1948.

High speed oval
The first Lesmo curve was modified to be made faster, and the track infrastructure and facilities were also updated and improved to better accommodate the teams and spectators.

The Automobile Club of Italy held  Race of Two Worlds exhibition competitions, intended to pit United States Auto Club IndyCars against European Formula One and sports cars. The races were held on the oval at the end of June in 1957 and 1958, with three 63 lap  heat races each year, races which colloquially became known as the Monzanapolis series. Concerns were raised among the European drivers that flat-out racing on the banking would be too dangerous, so ultimately only Ecurie Ecosse and Maserati represented European racing at the first running. The American teams had brought special Firestone tyres with them, reinforced to withstand high-speed running on the bumpy Monza surface, but the Maseratis' steering was badly affected by the larger-than-usual tyre size, leading to the Modena-based team withdrawal.

Ecurie Ecosse's three Jaguar D-type sports cars used their Le Mans-specification tyres with no ill-effects, but since they raced at less than their practice speeds to conserve their tyres, they were completely out paced. Two heats in 1957 were won by Jimmy Bryan in his Kuzma-Offenhauser Dean Van Lines Special, and the last by Troy Ruttman in the Watson-Offenhauser John Zink Special. In 1958 Jaguar, Ferrari and Maserati teams appeared alongside the Indy roadsters, but once again the American cars dominated the event and Jim Rathmann won the three races in a Watson-Offenhauser car.

Stirling Moss and Phil Hill both won twice in this period, with Hill's win at Monza making him the first American to win a Formula One race. The 1961 race saw the death of Wolfgang von Trips and fifteen spectators when a collision with Jim Clark's Lotus sent von Trips' car airborne and into the barriers on Parabolica.

Although the accident did not occur on the oval section of the track, the high speeds were deemed unsafe and F1 use of the oval was ended; future Grands Prix were held on the shorter road circuit, with the banking appearing one last time in the film Grand Prix. New safety walls, rails and fences were added before the next race and the refuelling area was moved further from the track.

The banking held the last race in 1969 with the 1000 km of Monza, the event moving to the road circuit the next year. The banking still exists, albeit in a decayed state in the years since the last race, escaping demolition in the 1990s. It is used once a year for the Monza Rally, which served part of the 2021 World Rally Championship, which was the first FIA championship event since 1969. The banked oval was used several times for record breaking until the late 1960s, although the severe bumping was a major suspension and tyre test for the production cars attempting endurance records, such as the Ford Corsair GT which in 1964 captured 13 records.

Circuit changes and modernisation
Both car and Grand Prix motorcycle racing were regular attractions at Monza. These races involved drivers constantly slipstreaming competing cars, which produced several close finishes, such as in 1967, 1969, and 1971.

As the speed of the machines increased, two chicanes were added in 1972 to reduce racing speeds – the Variante del Rettifilo at the middle of the start/finish straight, and the Variante Ascari. Grand Prix motorcycles continued to use the un-slowed road track until two serious accidents resulted in five deaths, including Renzo Pasolini and Jarno Saarinen, in 1973, and motorcycle racing did not return to Monza until 1981. The 1972 chicanes were soon seen to be ineffective at slowing cars; the Vialone was remade in 1974, the other, Curva Grande in 1976, and a third also added in 1976 before the Lesmo, with extended run-off areas.

With technology still increasing vehicle speeds the track was modified again in 1979 with added safety measures such as new kerbs, extended run-off areas and tyre-barriers to improve safety for drivers off the track. The infrastructure was also improved, with pits able to accommodate 46 cars, and an upgraded paddock and scrutineering facilities. These changes encouraged world championship motorcycling to return in 1981, but further safety work was undertaken through the 1980s. Also in the 1980s the podium, paddock and pits complex, stands, and camp site were either rebuilt or improved.

In  the stands were reworked to expand capacity to 51,000. In , the chicane on the main straight was altered, changing from a double left-right chicane to a single right-left chicane in an attempt to reduce the frequent accidents at the starts due to the conformation of the braking area, although it is still deemed unsafe in terms of motorcycle racing. The second chicane was also re-profiled. In the Formula 1 Grand Prix of the same year, the first to use these new chicanes, a fire marshal, Paolo Gislimberti, was killed by flying debris after a big pileup at the second chicane.

In 2007, the run-off area at the second chicane was changed from gravel to asphalt. At the 2010 Monza Superbike World Championship round, Italian rider Max Biaggi set the fastest ever motorcycle lap of Monza when he rode his Aprilia RSV4 1000 F to pole position in a time of 1:42.121. In the Superpole qualification for the 2011 race, he improved on this lap time, for a new lap record of 1:41.745 and his speed was captured at 205+ MPH.

In late 2016, work was planned on a new first bend, which would have bypassed the first chicane and the Curva Grande. Drivers were to go through a fast right hand kink and into a new, faster chicane. Work was planned for to be completed by 2017 in hopes of a renewed contract for Formula 1. Gravel would have also returned to the run-off area at the Parabolica bend. However, plans for the track's change were suspended due to the track being in the historic Monza Park.

A lap of the circuit in a Formula One car

Monza, throughout its long and storied history has been known for its high-speed, simplistic (compared to "harder" circuits such as Singapore or Monaco, which are tight, unforgiving street circuits with lots of corners) nature thanks to its 1920s design and the few alterations it has received, and is currently the fastest track on the Formula One calendar and has been so since 1991. Monza consists of very long straights and tight chicanes, putting a premium on good braking stability and traction. The  circuit is very hard on engines; Formula 1 engines are at full throttle for nearly 80% of the lap, with engine failures common, notably Fernando Alonso in the 2006 Italian Grand Prix or Nico Rosberg in the 2015 Italian Grand Prix.

The circuit is generally flat, but has a gradual gradient from the second Lesmos to the Variante Ascari. Due to the low aerodynamic profile needed, with its resulting low downforce, the grip is very low; understeer is a more serious issue than at other circuits; however, the opposite effect, oversteer, is also present in the second sector, requiring the use of a very distinctive opposite lock technique. Since both maximum power and minimal drag are keys for speed on the straights, only competitors with enough power or aerodynamic efficiency at their disposal are able to challenge for the top places.

Formula One cars are set up with one of the smallest wing angles on the F1 calendar to ensure the lowest level of drag on the straights. There are only 6 corner complexes at Monza: the first two chicanes, the two Lesmos, the Ascari complex and the Parabolica. Thus cars are set up for maximum performance on the straights.

This is the scene of many first-lap accidents. Higher kerbs were installed at the first two chicanes in 2009 to prevent cutting.

Good traction out of the first corner is imperative for a quick lap. The braking point is just under the bridge. The kerbs are brutal and it is very easy for a car to become unbalanced and a driver to lose control, as Kimi Räikkönen did in 2005. This chicane is probably the best overtaking chance on the lap, as it is the only one with the "slow corner, long straight, slow corner"; one of the characteristics of modern circuits.

The Curve di Lesmo are two corners that are not as fast as they used to be, but are still challenging corners. A mistake at one of these corners will result in a spin into the gravel, while good exits can set a driver up for an overtaking move into Variante Ascari.

The downhill straight down to Variante Ascari is very bumpy under the bridge. Variante Ascari is a very tricky sequence of corners and is key to the lap time.

A good exit and slipstream off a fellow driver along the main straight can produce an overtaking opportunity under heavy braking into Variante del Rettifilo; however, it is difficult to follow a leading car closely through the Parabolica as the tow will reduce downforce and cornering speed.

They experience a maximum g-force of 4.50 during deceleration, and the track has many dramatic high to low speed transitions.

Lap records 

Lewis Hamilton recorded the fastest pole position lap at Monza in 2020, when he lapped in 1:18.887 at an average speed of  – the fastest average lap speed recorded in qualifying for a World Championship event. The official race lap record for the current circuit layout is 1:21.046, set by Rubens Barrichello during the 2004 Italian Grand Prix. The fastest official race lap records of Autodromo Nazionale di Monza are listed as:

Deaths from crashes

1922 Fritz Kuhn (Austro-Daimler), killed during practice for the 1922 Italian Grand Prix
1923 Enrico Giaccone, riding as passenger in a Fiat 805 during private testing, with Pietro Bordino driving
1923 Ugo Sivocci (Alfa Romeo P1), killed during practice for the 1923 Italian Grand Prix
1924 Count Louis Zborowski (Mercedes), killed after crashing into a tree at Lesmo during the 1924 Italian Grand Prix
1928 Emilio Materassi and 27 spectators killed after Materassi crashed his Talbot into the grandstand during the 1928 Italian Grand Prix
1931 Luigi Arcangeli (Alfa Romeo), killed after crashing at Lesmo during practice for the 1931 Italian Grand Prix
1933 Giuseppe Campari (Alfa Romeo Tipo B 2.6 litre), Mario Umberto Borzacchini (Maserati 8C-3000) and Stanislas Czaykowski (Bugatti), killed after crashing at the south banking during the 1933 Monza Grand Prix
1954 Rupert Hollaus, killed during practice during the Italian motorcycle Grand Prix
1955 Alberto Ascari, killed during private testing at the Vialone, which is now the Ascari chicane, driving a Ferrari 750 Monza, just four days after his harbour crash in the 1955 Monaco Grand Prix
1961 Wolfgang von Trips and 14 spectators killed after von Trips collided with Jim Clark approaching the Parabolica on the second lap of the 1961 Italian Grand Prix
1965 Bruno Deserti, killed during Ferrari official test prior to Le Mans in a Ferrari P2/3 4000 cc
1965 Tommy Spychiger, killed during 1000K Sports car race in Ferrari 365P2
1970 Jochen Rindt, killed after crashing at the Parabolica during practice for the 1970 Italian Grand Prix
1973 Renzo Pasolini, Jarno Saarinen killed in a mass crash at the Curva Grande during the 250 cc class of the Nations Grand Prix (Prior to 1990, the Italian round was called the Nations Grand Prix)
1973 Carlo Chionio, Renzo Colombini and Renato Galtrucco during a race for 500 cc Juniores Italian motorcycle championship
1974 Silvio Moser, died in hospital one month after suffering injuries at the 1000 km Monza race
1978 Ronnie Peterson, died in hospital after crashing during the start of the 1978 Italian Grand Prix
1998 Michael Paquay, Belgian motorbike racer, died after a crash in practice for the Italian round of World Supersport Championships, Honda CBR 600
2000 Paolo Gislimberti, a marshal hit by debris from a first-lap accident at the Roggia chicane during the Italian Grand Prix

Previous track configurations

Events

 Current

 April: GT World Challenge Europe 3 Hours of Monza, GT2 European Series, GT4 European Series, Renault Clio Cup Europe, Austria Formula 3 Cup
 June: 24H Series 12 Hours of Monza, Eurocup-3, Italian GT Championship, Italian F4 Championship
 July: FIA World Endurance Championship 6 Hours of Monza, F1 Academy, Porsche Sports Cup Suisse
 September: Formula One Italian Grand Prix, FIA Formula 2 Championship, FIA Formula 3 Championship, Porsche Supercup, International GT Open, Euroformula Open Championship, TCR Europe Series, Formula Regional European Championship, Italian GT Championship, TCR Italian Series, Porsche Carrera Cup France, Porsche Carrera Cup Italy, BOSS GP

 Former

 Auto GP (1999–2005, 2007, 2009–2014, 2016)
 BMW M1 Procar Championship (1979)
 BPR Global GT Series (1995–1996)
 Deutsche Tourenwagen Masters (2021)
 European Formula 5000 Championship (1970–1971, 1974)
 European Formula Two Championship (1973)
 European Le Mans Series 4 Hours of Monza (2004–2005, 2007–2008, 2017–2022)
 European Touring Car Championship (1964–1986, 1988, 2000–2001, 2003–2004)
 European Touring Car Cup (2012–2013, 2017)
 Ferrari Challenge Finali Mondiali (2018)
 FIA European Formula 3 Championship (1975–1980, 1982–1984)
 FIA Formula 3 European Championship (2013, 2015, 2017)
 FIA GT Championship (1999–2001, 2003–2005, 2007–2008)
 FIA Sportscar Championship (1999–2001, 2003)
 FIM Endurance World Championship (1964–1965, 1985, 1987)
 Formula Renault Eurocup (2004–2005, 2016–2020)
 French F4 Championship (2021)
 GP2 Series Monza GP2 round (2005–2016)
 GP3 Series (2010–2018)
 Grand Prix motorcycle racing Italian motorcycle Grand Prix (1949–1968, 1970–1971, 1981, 1983, 1986–1987)
 International Formula 3000 (1988, 1990, 2001–2004)
 Race of Two Worlds (1957–1958)
 Sidecar World Championship (1949–1957, 1965, 1967, 1999–2003)
 Superbike World Championship (1990, 1992–1993, 1995–2013)
 Superleague Formula (2009)
 World Series by Renault (2005, 2007–2008, 2011, 2013–2014, 2016–2017)
 World Sportscar Championship (1963–1975, 1980–1988, 1990–1992)
 World Touring Car Championship FIA WTCC Race of Italy (2005–2008, 2010–2013, 2017)

 Special

 Nike Breaking2

In popular culture 

 Italian rock band The Rock Alchemist, whose song "The Temple", from their 2017 album: Elements, was written as an anthem for the Monza Motor Racing Circuit.
 The Luigi Circuit in Mario Kart Wii is loosely based on the track minus the chicanes.

See also
 List of sporting venues with a highest attendance of 100,000 or more

Notes

References

External links

Autodromo Nazionale Monza official website
Autodromo Nazionale Monza on Google Maps (Current Formula 1 Tracks)
Autodromo Internazionale di Monza circuit history at RacingCircuits.info

Pre-World Championship Grand Prix circuits
Formula One circuits
Italian Grand Prix
Superbike World Championship circuits
Grand Prix motorcycle circuits
Motorsport venues in Italy
Autodromo Nazionale Monza
Sports venues in Lombardy
Sports venues completed in 1922
1922 establishments in Italy
World Touring Car Championship circuits
Sport in Monza